Lars Andersson i Hedensbyn  (22 September 1888 – 29 March 1974) was a Swedish politician. He was a member of the Centre Party.

Centre Party (Sweden) politicians
1888 births
1974 deaths